Orlovka is a rural locality (a village) in Krasnovoskhodsky Selsoviet, Iglinsky District, Bashkortostan, Russia. The population was 90 as of 2010. There is 1 street.

Geography 
Orlovka is located 77 km northeast of Iglino (the district's administrative centre) by road. Tyulko-Tamak is the nearest rural locality.

References 

Rural localities in Iglinsky District